It's Christmas, Eve is a soundtrack album by American singer LeAnn Rimes. It was released on October 12, 2018, via EverLeRecords and Thirty Tigers. The project was the soundtrack Rimes recorded for the 2018 Christmas television film of the same name. A total of nine songs comprised the album, including several original compositions penned by Rimes.

Background and content
In 2018, LeAnn Rimes played the main role in a Hallmark Channel television film titled It's Christmas, Eve, as well as providing the sound track. Speaking with TV Insider, Rimes explained "...there’s a zillion different ways to get music out in people’s hands and their ears, and this is just a great way to be able to combine both film and music into one project." 

The album consisted of nine tracks, five of which were composed by Rimes. She collaborated with producers Darrell Brown and Dave Audé on the songs. The title track was the first song she composed, beginning the writing process in February 2018. "It’s a love song of hope, togetherness and a remembrance of what’s most important in life, creating memories with the ones we love," she told Variety. Other original tracks were the songs "You and Me and Christmas" and "The Gift of Your Love". The soundtrack also includes Rimes's version of "White Christmas", "Carol of the Bells" and two medley holiday tracks. The album was recorded at three studios located in both Tennessee and California: Absolute Sound, Audacious, Surf Shack and Village Recorders.

Release
It's Christmas, Eve was released on October 12, 2018, on EverLe Records in conjunction with the Thirty Tigers label. It was offered as both a compact disc and as a digital download. An 11-city holiday tour followed the album's release called the "You and Me and Christmas Tour". Rimes appeared on Fox's "New Years Eve Toast & Roast 2021" where she performed tracks from the project. In 2018, the soundtrack peaked at number five on the Billboard Top Independent Albums chart.

Track listing

Personnel
All credits are adapted from the liner notes of It's Christmas, Eve and AllMusic.

Musical personnel
 Dave Audé – Musician
 Darrell Brown – Musician
 Joe Cleveland – Musician
 Tim Davis – Background vocals
 Danny Dunlap – Musician
 Rob Dziubia – Musician
 Greg Hagan – Musician
 Tiffany Palmer – Background vocals
 LeAnn Rimes – Lead vocals, background vocals
 Jason Robinson – Musician
 Waddy Wachtel – Musician

Technical personnel
 Dave Audé – Arranger, engineer, mixing, producer
 Niko Bolas – Engineer
 Darrell Brown – Arranger, engineer, producer
 Danny Dunlap – Additional production
 Hannah Maldon – Artwork
 Kinga Nowicka – Artwork
 Cindi Peters – Production coordination
 Ryan Plummer – Photography
 LeAnn Rimes – Arranger, producer
 Jason Robinson – Additional production
 Matthew Vanleeuwen – Back cover photo
 Sam Willis – Mastering, mixing

Charts

Release history

References

2018 soundtrack albums
Albums produced by Darrell Brown (musician)
Albums produced by LeAnn Rimes
LeAnn Rimes albums
Thirty Tigers albums